Thorsteinn Einarsson (born March 19, 1996 in Reykjavík, Iceland) is an Austrian–Icelandic musician who became known through the Austrian talent show Die große Chance.

Biography
Einarsson was born to an Icelandic father and an Austrian mother. He moved to Salzburg for the first time at the age of five, where his father studied singing. After three years, his parents separated and he moved with his mother back to Reykjavík. At age eleven, he founded his first band. At 14, he moved back to Salzburg, where his father worked as an opera singer. After his education, he began a cookery apprenticeship. In 2014, he took part in the talent show Die große Chance where he placed fourth. At the 2015 Amadeus Awards he was awarded in the category Songwriter of the Year.

Discography

Albums

Singles

References

1996 births
Austrian people of Icelandic descent
21st-century Austrian male singers
Thorsteinn Einarsson
Thorsteinn Einarsson
Living people
Thorsteinn Einarsson
Singing talent show contestants